The US Aviation Cloud Dancer is an American ultralight motorglider that was designed by Erwin Rodger and Roger Delura and produced by US Aviation. The aircraft was supplied as a kit for amateur construction.

Design and development
It features a cantilever mid-wing, a single-seat, open cockpit, conventional landing gear, a V-tail and a single engine in pusher configuration.

The aircraft is made from aluminum and fiberglass. Its  span wing with a 12:1 aspect ratio is built around an aluminum D-cell leading edge, with the aft part of the wing fabric is supported by removable fiberglass battens. The wing fabric provides an 80% double surface airfoil. The controls are three-axis, using spoilerons for roll control. Air brakes are also fitted. The landing gear features fiberglass suspension and the tailwheel is steerable. The wings are quickly removable and the whole aircraft was designed to be transported on the roof of a 1980s-era station wagon, taking 20 minutes to assemble or disassemble. The standard engine supplied was the  Rotax 277 single cylinder, two-stroke aircraft engine.

Production ended in 1994 and the conventional-tailed, but otherwise similar US Aviation Cumulus commenced production in 1995.

Specifications (Cloud Dancer)

References

1980s United States ultralight aircraft
Homebuilt aircraft
Single-engined pusher aircraft
Aircraft first flown in 1983
Mid-wing aircraft
Motor gliders